Geary is a ghost town in Doniphan County, Kansas, United States.

History
Geary was laid out in 1857. It was named for John W. Geary, third Territorial Governor of Kansas. A post office was established at Geary in 1857, and remained in operation until it was discontinued in 1905.

References

Further reading

External links
 Doniphan County maps: Current, Historic, KDOT

Geography of Doniphan County, Kansas
Ghost towns in Kansas
1857 establishments in Kansas Territory